Tree was a controversial  high inflatable sculpture by the artist Paul McCarthy that was briefly installed in the Place Vendôme in Paris in October 2014 as part of a  exhibition called "Hors les murs".

Although officially described as a Christmas tree, it was widely criticised for its similarity in appearance to a huge green butt plug. McCarthy admitted that it was deliberately shaped as such as a joke.

The controversy over the sculpture led to McCarthy being assaulted and the sculpture being vandalised only two days after its installation; a vandal climbed the fencing around it and cut the power supply which kept it inflated, in addition to cutting the cords holding it up. McCarthy stated that he did not want the work repaired or replaced.

The attention given to the sculpture brought a boom in sales of real butt plugs in Paris: a sex shop owner reported that he usually sold 50 per month predominantly to gay men, but in November 2014 sold over 1,000 roughly divided equally between heterosexual men and women.

In 2016 he again exhibited Tree at Paramount Ranch 3, amongst the trees and rolling hills of the Santa Monica Mountains, where the reception was positive and visitors "reveled in its absurdist glory".

See also 
 Brussels Christmas tree, abstract Christmas tree which caused controversy in 2012

References 

Sculptures in France
2014 sculptures
Buildings and structures in Paris
Christmas trees
Destroyed sculptures
Obscenity controversies in sculpture
Vandalized works of art